Following are the longest, widest, and deepest rifts and valleys in various worlds of the Solar System.

List

See also
 List of Solar System extremes
 List of largest craters in the Solar System
 List of tallest mountains in the Solar System
 List of largest lakes and seas in the Solar System

References

Solar System
Rifts and valleys, largest in the Solar System

Extraterrestrial valleys
Rifts and grabens
Solar System
rifts canyons valleys
Rifts, canyons and valleys